Sir Edward Knatchbull, 7th Baronet (12 December 1704 – 21 November 1789) was an Irish politician.

He was the third son of Sir Edward Knatchbull, 4th Baronet and Alice Wyndham, daughter of Colonel John Wyndham. In 1763, he succeeded his nephew Sir Wyndham Knatchbull-Wyndham, 6th Baronet as baronet. Knatchbull was a Member of Parliament (MP) for Armagh Borough in the Irish House of Commons from 1727 until 1760.

Knatchbull married Grace Legge, second daughter of William Legge. They had five daughters and three sons. He died, aged 84, and was succeeded in the baronetcy by his only surviving son Edward.

References

1704 births
1789 deaths
Baronets in the Baronetage of England
Irish MPs 1727–1760
Members of the Parliament of Ireland (pre-1801) for County Armagh constituencies
Edward